A witch doctor (also spelled witch-doctor) was originally a type of healer who treated ailments believed to be caused by witchcraft. The term is now more commonly used to refer to healers, particularly in regions which use traditional healing rather than contemporary medicine.

Original meaning of the term
In its original meaning, witch doctors were not exactly witches themselves, but rather people who had remedies to protect others against witchcraft.

Witchcraft-induced conditions were their area of expertise, as described in this 1858 news report from England:

Recourse was had by the girl's parents to a cunning man, named Burrell, residing at Copford, who has long borne the name of "The Wizard of the North:" but her case was of so peculiar a character as to baffle his skill to dissolve the spell, Application was next made to a witch doctor named Murrell, residing at Hadleigh, Essex, who undertook to effect a cure, giving a bottle of medication, for which he did not forget to charge 3s. 6d., and promising to pay a visit on Monday evening to the "old witch," Mrs. Mole, and put an end to her subtle arts...

...the news of the expected coming of the witch-doctor spread far and wide, and about eight o'clock there could not have been less than 200 people collected near the cottage of Mrs. Mole to witness the supernatural powers of the Hadleigh wizard.

In Europe
The Oxford English Dictionary states that the first record of the use of this term was in 1718, in Francis Hutchinson's work An Historical Essay concerning Witchcraft, with Observations upon Matters of Fact; Tending to Clear the Texts of the Sacred Scriptures, and Confute the Vulgar Errors about that Point. Hutchinson used the phrase in a chapter defending a prisoner who was charged with witchcraft, by asserting that the "Witch-Doctor" himself was the one using sorcery:

The said Dorothy Durent, having been with a Witch-Doctor, acknowledges upon Oath, that by his Advice she hang'd up her Child's Blanket in the Chimney, found a Toad in it at Night, had put it into the Fire, and held it there tho' it made a great and horrible Noise, and flash'd like Gunpowder, and went off like a Pistol, and then became invisible, and that by this the Prisoner was scorch'd and burn'd lamentably. 
 
Charles Mackay's book, Extraordinary Popular Delusions and the Madness of Crowds, first published in 1841, attests to the practice of belief in witch doctors in England at the time.
In the north of England, the superstition lingers to an almost inconceivable extent. Lancashire abounds with witch-doctors, a set of quacks, who pretend to cure diseases inflicted by the devil. The practices of these worthies may be judged of by the following case, reported in the "Hertford Reformer," of the 23rd of June, 1838. The witch-doctor alluded to is better known by the name of the cunning man, and has a large practice in the counties of Lincoln and Nottingham. According to the writer in "The Reformer," the dupe, whose name is not mentioned, had been for about two years afflicted with a painful abscess and had been prescribed for without relief by more than one medical gentleman. He was urged by some of his friends, not only in his own village but in neighbouring ones, to consult the witch-doctor, as they were convinced he was under some evil influence. He agreed and sent his wife to the cunning man, who lived in New Saint Swithin's, in Lincoln. She was informed by this ignorant impostor that her husband's disorder was an infliction of the devil, occasioned by his next-door neighbours, who had made use of certain charms for that purpose. From the description he gave of the process, it appears to be the same as that employed by Dr. Fian and Gellie Duncan, to work woe upon King James. He stated that the neighbours, instigated by a witch, whom he pointed out, took some wax, and moulded it before the fire into the form of her husband, as near as they could represent him; they then pierced the image with pins on all sides – repeated the Lord's Prayer backwards, and offered prayers to the devil that he would fix his stings into the person whom that figure represented, in like manner as they pierced it with pins. To counteract the effects of this diabolical process, the witch-doctor prescribed a certain medicine, and a charm to be worn next to the body, on that part where the disease principally lay. The patient was to repeat the 109th and 119th Psalms every day, or the cure would not be effectual. The fee which he claimed for this advice was a guinea.

In Africa
 

In southern Africa, traditional healers are known as sangomas. The Oxford English Dictionary states that the first use of the term "witch doctor" to refer to African shamans (i.e. medicine men) was in 1836 in a book by Robert Montgomery Martin.

In Nepal and Northeastern India 

Jhākri is the Nepali word for shaman. It is sometimes reserved specifically for practitioners of Nepali shamanism, such as that practiced among the Tamang people and the Magars; it is also used in the Indian states of Sikkim and West Bengal, which border Nepal.

Jhākri shamanism is practiced among numerous ethnic groups of Nepal and Northeast India, including the Limbu, Rai, Sunwar, Sherpa, Kami, Tamang, Gurung, Magars, Lepcha and Khas. Belief in spirits is prevalent, hence also the fear of spirit possession. Some vernacular words for jhākri are phedangbo in the Limbu language, maangpa or nakchyong in Khambu, and boongthing in Lepcha.

Jhākris perform rituals during weddings, funerals, and harvests. They diagnose and cure diseases. Their practices are influenced by Hinduism, Tibetan Buddhism, Mun, and Bön rites.

Even now the indigenous ethnic groups of Assam, Northeastern India (especially in the Mayong region as well other rural places) have shamanistic medicine man who treats diseases using sorcery as well as witchcraft and black magic for which it was once renowned. Similar Shamans and Medicine Man are prevalent among the indigenous communities throughout the rural areas of the NE India.

Other
 Bomoh
 Curandero
 Kahuna
 Nganga
 Plastic shaman 
 Quimbanda

References

Further reading

Maxell, Nicole (1990) Witch Doctor's Apprentice. New York: Citadel Press. ; 

1710s neologisms
African witchcraft
Asian witchcraft
European witchcraft
Austronesian spirituality
Shamanism
Traditional healthcare occupations